The Middle Fork of the Salmon River is a  river in central Idaho in the northwestern United States. It is a tributary to the Salmon River, and lies in the center of the  Frank Church-River of No Return Wilderness Area.

The middle fork is an exceptionally popular and difficult whitewater rafting and kayaking destination.  Given Federal protection in 1980, the wilderness area it lies within is part of the largest roadless tract left in the lower 48 states.

Course 
The Middle Fork is a heavily whitewatered  tributary of the Salmon River, the main tributary of the Snake River, which in turn is the main tributary to the Columbia River. The nearest town is Stanley, Idaho. The 47 mile long Bear Valley Creek and Marsh Creek converge to form the Middle Fork. The Middle Fork flows through  of rugged terrain known as the Salmon River Mountains, peaks of which reach .

Permit
A permit is required to travel down the Middle Fork of the Salmon River, which can be obtained through the Four Rivers Lottery and Permit Reservation System. The Middle Fork of the Salmon River permit season runs from May 28 - Sept. 3. Pre and the post season launches are first-come, first-served. Getting a recreational permit to float the Middle Fork is notoriously difficult and is awarded through a lottery system. There are a combined total of seven commercial and recreational launches a day. To become a permit holder you have to be 18 years old. The permit holder must work with a group to take care of the fees. The permit cannot be given to someone else, and the permit holder must be there at all times on the river. The permit holder must make sure that the rules, which are given by the United States Forest Service, are followed. An example would be that they must have a fire pan and some sort of portable human waste containment system (groover, WAG BAGs, etc.).

Rapids

The Middle Fork has three hundred raftable rapids. Some of the well-known rapids on the Middle Fork are Dagger Falls, Sulphur Slide, Velvet Falls, the Chutes, Power House, Pistol Creek, Tappan Falls, Red Side, Weber, Cliffside, Rubber, Hancock and Devil's Tooth.  All but one of these are class III+ to class IV (on the scale of I to VI International scale of river difficulty classification system), with Dagger Falls being class V.

Hot springs
The Middle Fork has six natural hot springs in the first  of the river, Trail Flat, Sheepeater, Sunflower, Whitey Cox, Loon Creek and Hospital Bar. The hot springs vary in temperature and are all very popular places to stop on the river.

 Sheepeater hot springs is a half a mile from the river. There are three different pools which range from "super hot" to "just right".
 Sunflower hot springs has five pools. There is also a part of the hot spring that pours off the rocks and makes a shower.
 Whitey Cox's hot springs is up on a hill with large sandy-bottom pools, but as of at least 2004 has been infested with red spider mites and is not recommended for soaking.
 Loon Creek hot springs is a mile-and-a-half hike along Loon Creek from the Middle Fork. A wooden tub has been built with a nice view of Loon Creek.
 Hospital Bar is a small hot spring with two pools, one right next to the river.

List of local flora and fauna

Mammals

 Badger
 Bighorn sheep
 Bobcat
 Black bear
 Chipmunk
 Coyote

 Moose
 Mountain goat
 Mountain lion (cougar)
 Mule deer
 Muskrat
 Otter

 Porcupine
 Rocky Mountain elk
 Skunk
 Weasel
 Wolf

Vegetation

 Douglas fir
 Grand fir
 Subalpine fir
 Common juniper
 Rocky Mountain juniper
 Western larch
 Mountain mahogany
 Limber pine
 Lodgepole pine
 Ponderosa pine
 Engelmann spruce

 Birch
 Bitter bush
 Black cottonwood
 Blue elderberry
 Bracken fern
 Dwarf Oregon grape
 Hawthorn
 Little wood rose
 Mock orange
 Nine bark
 Quaking aspen

 Rabbit brush
 Red osier dog wood
 Rocky Mountain maple
 Sagebrush
 Service berry
 Snow berry
 Snow brush
 Thimble berry
 Wax currant
 White alder
 Willows

Fish
 Cutthroat trout
 Rainbow trout, includes steelhead
 Mountain whitefish
 Bull trout
 Chinook salmon

Birds

 Killdeer
 Osprey
 Belted kingfisher
 Common merganser
 American dipper

 Cliff swallow
 Red tailed hawk
 Bald eagle
 Golden eagle
 Blue grouse
 Ruffed grouse

 Chukar
 Magpie
 Mourning dove
 Great horned owl

See also
List of rivers of Idaho
List of longest streams of Idaho
List of National Wild and Scenic Rivers

References

Notes 
Midmore, Joe. Middle Fork History. Harrah's Club Inc. Lake Tahoe, NV, 1970.
Quinn, James M. Quinn, James W. Quinn, Terry L. and king James G. Handbook to the Middle Fork of the Salmon River Canyon. Commercial Printing Company Medford, OR, 1981.
Sierra Club. International Whitewater Rating Systems. 2003
USDA Forest Service. The Middle Fork of the Salmon River. January 8, 2008

Rivers of Custer County, Idaho
Rivers of Idaho County, Idaho
Rivers of Lemhi County, Idaho
Rivers of Idaho
Rivers of Valley County, Idaho
Salmon-Challis National Forest
Tributaries of the Salmon River (Idaho)
Wild and Scenic Rivers of the United States